HLA-B47 (B47) is an HLA–B serotype. The serotype identifies the HLA-B*47 gene products (B*4701, B*4702, B*4703) . Comparison of B47 nucleotide sequence with other HLA-B sequences shows a segment of 228 bp identical with B44 in the alpha 1 domain and a segment of 218 bp identical with B27 in the alpha 2 domain, but only a 91 bp segment of identity with B13 in the alpha 1 domain. The complex pattern of substitutions and their degree of divergence indicate that HLA-B13 and HLA-Bw47 alleles are not related by a simple mutational event. B47 is linked to (close to on the chromosome) a gene that causes adrenal deficiency. B47 is generally low in frequency and with highest known frequencies in Central and Western Africa. (For terminology help see: HLA-serotype tutorial)

Serotype

Serotyping for B47 is poor and typing is best performed with SSP-PCR or gene sequencing.

Disease Associations
B47 is linked to Adrenal 21-hydroxylase deficiency.

B*4701 frequencies

References

4